David Mangnall (21 September 1905 – 10 April 1962) was an English football player and manager. As a player, he scored 144 goals from 221 appearances in the Football League playing for Leeds United, Huddersfield Town, Birmingham, West Ham United, Millwall and Queens Park Rangers. He was manager of Queens Park Rangers for eight years.

Football career

Playing career
Born in Wigan, Lancashire, Mangnall was a busy and athletic centre-forward who played for Leeds United between 1927 and 1930. After playing with First Division Huddersfield Town until 1934, he joined Birmingham. He was then signed by West Ham United in 1935 as a replacement for Vic Watson. He scored 25 goals in 35 League appearances for the Hammers and was their top scorer for the 1935–36 season, but moved to Millwall the following year.

Mangnall helped Millwall, who were competing in the Third Division South at the time, into the FA Cup semi-finals in 1937. Millwall's giant-killing feats earned Mangnall the title of, David the Giant Killer as a procession of clubs came to The Old Den and were devoured by The Lions. Following a 6–1 victory away to Aldershot in which Magnall scored 4 goals, Millwall were drawn at home in every round. After a 7–0 defeat of Gateshead, it was the turn of Second Division Fulham. Millwall sent them packing 2–0. First Division Chelsea were the next team to try their luck at The Den. Chelsea were more embarrassed than Fulham when Mangnall's Millwall sent them home 3–0. Derby County, the First Division runners-up the previous season, were the next team to visit. Millwall's record crowd of 48,672 packed into The Den to watch Mangnall score first, with his striking partner McCartney netting the winner four minutes from time. However, when Millwall drew Manchester City, nobody thought they even had a chance of beating them. Millwall got the better of City's star studded team, with Mangnall scoring a goal in each half, making Millwall the first Third Division team in the history of the competition to reach the semi-final. Millwall's dream was ended when they were paired with Sunderland in the semi-final, played at neutral Leeds Road and although Magnall scored yet again, The Lions went down 2–1. There was some consolation for Mangnall's Millwall as they won promotion to the Second Division the following season.

Management career
On 16 May 1939, just before the outbreak of World War II, he joined Queens Park Rangers as a player and on 29 April 1944 was offered the player-manager role. Although initially reluctant to take it on, he did so, and he built a team that in the 1947–48 season, with George Smith as captain, won the Third Division South championship by four points to give QPR their first-ever promotion. After four tough seasons in the Second Division they were relegated back to the Third Division, where they were to remain for fifteen seasons before Alec Stock led them to promotion again.

After relegation in 1951–52, Mangnall left the club and never managed in the Football League again. He is one of only six QPR managers to achieve a promotion to a higher division, the others being Alec Stock (who managed the feat twice, in successive seasons), Gordon Jago, Terry Venables, Ian Holloway and Neil Warnock.

Mangnall died in Penzance, Cornwall, in 1962 at the age of 56.

Notes

References

1905 births
1962 deaths
Footballers from Wigan
English footballers
Association football forwards
Maltby Main F.C. players
Doncaster Rovers F.C. players
Leeds United F.C. players
Huddersfield Town A.F.C. players
Birmingham City F.C. players
West Ham United F.C. players
Millwall F.C. players
Queens Park Rangers F.C. players
English Football League players
English football managers
Queens Park Rangers F.C. managers